The 22975 Bandra Terminus–Ramnagar Express is an express train of Western Railway Zone that runs between  in Mumbai and  in Uttarakhand. It is operated by Western Railway zone of Indian Railways. It is currently being operated with 22975/22976 train numbers on a weekly basis.

Service

22975 Bandra Terminus–Ramnagar Express has an average speed of 55 km/hr and covers 1640 km in 29h 40m.

22976 Ramnagar–Bandra Terminus Express has an average speed of 55 km/hr and covers 1640 km in 30h 05m.

Route and halts 
The important halts of the train are:

Coach composition
The train has standard ICF rakes with max speed of 130 kmph. The train consists of 20 coaches:
 2 AC II Tier
 4 AC III Tier
 8 Sleeper coaches
 2 General Unreserved
 1 Seating cum Luggage Rake
 1 End on Generator

Schedule

Traction
This train is hauled by a Vadodara-based WAP-7 locomotive from Bandra Terminus until Kasganj after which a Izzatnagar-based  WDP-4D hauls the train for the remainder of its journey until Ramnagar.

Rake sharing
This train shares its rake with 22915/22916 Bandra Terminus–Hisar Superfast Express.

References

 

Transport in Mumbai
Transport in Ramnagar
Railway services introduced in 2014
Express trains in India
Rail transport in Uttar Pradesh
Rail transport in Madhya Pradesh
Rail transport in Maharashtra
Rail transport in Rajasthan
Rail transport in Uttarakhand
Rail transport in Gujarat